Jinan (also Romanized as Jīnān; also known as Janyān, Jainu, and Jeynū) is a village in Sedeh Rural District, Sedeh District, Qaen County, South Khorasan Province, Iran. At the 2006 census, its population was 78, in 29 families.

References 

Populated places in Qaen County